Beaman is thought to be either:

A surname of Norman origin from the English midlands. The name is an Anglicisation of the French Beaumont. It is claimed that English bearers of the name descended from Henry de Beaumont (died 1340).

Since it is a surname common in the Anglo-Welsh border regions, it has also been claimed that the surname is derived from 'ab Edmond' in the mid Anglo-Welsh border regions when surnames became more widely adopted prior to the 1500s. Historic evidence for this is provided by "Welsh Border Surnames from Ab Edmond" at

List of persons with the surname Beaman
Fernando Cortez Beaman, politician from Michigan during and after the American Civil War
Rear Admiral Gerald R. Beaman, US Navy commander
John Beaman, Alderney politician
Lori G. Beaman (born 1963), Canadian scholar of religion and law
Nathaniel Beaman, co-founder and president of the National Bank of Commerce of Norfolk, Virginia
Walter Beaman Jones, Jr, American Republican politician

List of persons with the surname Beman
Amos Beman (1812–1874), American preacher and abolitionist
Deane Beman, American professional golfer and golf administrator.
Jehiel Beman (1791–1858), African-American minister and abolitionist
Nathan Sidney Smith Beman (1785–1871), Fourth president of Rensselaer Polytechnic Institute
Samuel S. Beman (1822-1882), American lawyer and politician
Solon Spencer Beman (1853–1914), American architect

List of persons with the surname Beeman
Edward E. Beeman, Inventor of Medicinal Chewing Gum
Ellen Guon Beeman, American fantasy and science fiction author
Greg Beeman, American director and producer
Jen Beeman, American fashion designer and patternmaker
Joseph H. Beeman, (1833–1909) U.S. Representative from Mississippi
Vanessa Beeman, Grand Bard of the Gorseth Kernow
William Orman Beeman, actor, author, singer, and professor of anthropology at The University of Minnesota

See also
 Beamon (disambiguation)

References 

Surnames of Norman origin
Surnames of British Isles origin